Spec may refer to:
Specification (technical standard), an explicit set of requirements to be satisfied by a material, product, or service
datasheet, or "spec sheet"

People 
 Spec Harkness (1887-1952), American professional baseball pitcher
 Spec Keene (1894-1977), American college football, baseball and basketball coach
 Spec O'Donnell (1911-1986), American film actor
 Spec Richardson (1922-2016), former general manager of the Houston Astros Major League Baseball team
 Spec Sanders (1919-2003), American National Football League and All-America Football Conference player
 Spec Shea (1920–2002), American Major League Baseball pitcher

Science and technology 
 spec, an antibiotic resistance gene against spectinomycin
 Spectrum of a ring, a mathematical structure often written as Spec(R)
 Specifier (linguistics), in syntax
 Short for speculative evolution

SPEC 
 Standard Performance Evaluation Corporation, an organization that produces benchmarks
 Hampton Inn Court at the Steinke Physical Education Center (SPEC), a Texas A&M University basketball and volleyball arena
 Solid phase extraction chromatography

Other uses 
 Speculation, the purchase of an asset with the hope that it will become more valuable in the near future
 Spec, Virginia, United States, an unincorporated community
 Columbia Daily Spectator, a student newspaper nicknamed the Spec

See also 
 Specs (disambiguation)
 Spec racing
 Spec script
 Spec's Music, a defunct South Florida-based retail music and video rental chain
 Spec's Wine, Spirits & Finer Foods, a Texas-based liquor store chain

Lists of people by nickname